The 2013 season was the 99th in Sociedade Esportiva Palmeiras's history. It was the second time in history that Palmeiras played in the second division of the Campeonato Brasileiro. Palmeiras competed in the Brasileiro Serie B, Campeonato Paulista, the Copa Libertadores and the Copa do Brasil.

Key events 

 December 10, 2012: Palmeiras made its first trade signing the defender Ayrton from Coritiba.
 December 13, 2012: Fernando Prass from Vasco signed with Palmeiras.

 January 21, 2013: General elections for president and vice president. Paulo Nobre was elected, defeating Decio Perin by 153 votes against 106.
 January 24, 2013: After great speculation, the Argentine Riquelme did not come to Palmeiras. Paulo Nobre, the new president, said that Palmeiras would not have enough money for such a luxury.
 February 5, 2013: Two more players were announced for a loan until the end of the season, defender Marcelo Oliveira and midfielder Charles, the two coming from the team Cruzeiro. In exchange Palmeiras sent forward Luan.
 February 7, 2013: One more player was announced, the forward Kléber coming on loan from the Portuguese team Porto until the end of the year.
 February 8, 2013: Hernán Barcos signed with Grêmio. Palmeiras had a debt with the LDU (US$ 750,000) which Grêmio then assumed. In return Palmeiras received four players: Vilson, Rondinelly, Léo Gago and Leandro coming from a loan. Only Vilson was to stay indefinitely, the other three would return to Grêmio at the end of the season.
 February 22, 2013: Palmeiras announced the sponsorship contract with Kia Motors would end after the Campeonato Paulista.
 March 27, 2013: Palmeiras suffered a humiliating defeat, 6–2 against Mirassol. This caused some outrage among fans who went to the club headquarters to protest for better results.
 April 4, 2013: Leandro was called up by Felipão for the Brazil national football team to play a friendly game against Bolivia. Brazil won the game 3–1, with Leandro scoring the last goal.
 April 16, 2013: Both Leandro and Henrique were called up for the Brazil national football team to play a friendly game against Chile on April 24.
 April 18, 2013: Even though they lost their last match of the group stage, Palmeiras still qualified in first place moving to the round of 16 in the 2013 Copa Libertadores
 April 24, 2013: WTorre (responsible for construction of Allianz Parque) announced the sale of "naming rights" to Allianz, a German company already associated with other stadiums.
 June 6, 2013: Palmeiras reached a sponsorship agreement with Allianz for two games, the first against Sport Recife on June 8 and the second against América de Natal on June 11.
 June 7, 2013: Palmeiras signed its first international player of the year, the Paraguyan William Mendieta from Club Libertad.
 July 5, 2013: The midfielder Sebastián Eguren signed a contract until December 2014. Eguren defended the Uruguay national team in the 2013 FIFA Confederations Cup.
 August 21, 2013: The defender Henrique was called up by coach Felipão to compete in two friendly matches against Australia on September 7, and Portugal on September 10.
 October 26, 2013: After a 0–0 draw against São Caetano, Palmeiras secured its spot in the 2014 Série A.
 November 26, 2013: After some speculation coach Gilson Kleina renewed his contract for one more year.

Competitions

Campeonato Paulista 

The Campeonato Paulista is the major championship of São Paulo state, involving teams from all over the state. Palmeiras debuted in the competition on January 20 against Bragantino. The last time Palmeiras won the competition was in 2008. In 2013 Palmeiras finished placing sixth after being eliminated on penalties in the round of 16 against Santos.

Standings

First round 

Notes
Note 1: Match postponed from the original date, March 3, due to scheduling conflicts.

Quarter-finals

Copa Libertadores

Group stage

Standings

Matches

Knockout stages

Round of 16

Campeonato Brasileiro Série B

Standings

Matches 
Schedule released on March 25, 2013. The games had a break during the 2013 FIFA Confederations Cup, which was held between June and July in Brazil. Six rounds were played before the stoppage.

Notes
 Note 1: Palmeiras was punished with the loss of four home field matches because of incidents involving their fans in the match against Botafogo in Araraquara last year.
 Note 2: Palmeiras was again punished by Superior Tribunal de Justiça Desportiva because of fights in the Dario Rodrigues Leite stadium in Guaratinguetá during the 10th round of the competition.

Copa do Brasil 

The table for the competition was released on February 4, 2013. Palmeiras was the title holder. The team entered in the Round of 16. The draw for the round of 16 was held on August 6, 2013.

Round of 16

Players

Squad information

Libertadores squad 
Palmeiras sent the list of 30 players to CONMEBOL to play the Libertadores.

Note: For the knockout stages Palmeiras made two changes in the Libertadores squad: André Luiz replaced Marcos Vinícus and Serginho replaced Edilson.

Transfers

In

Out

Statistics

Overall statistics

Goalscorers 
In italic players who left the team in mid-season.

Disciplinary record

References

External links 
 Official site 

2013
Palmeiras